Blue Valley Academy is located on 148th street, next to Blue Valley USD 229 school district headquarters. It is an alternative education school that attempts to give an equal quality education in a smaller environment. Many of the other Blue Valley High Schools act as "parent" schools and many Blue Valley Academy students return to them to take certain electives not offered at the Academy.

The building is also home to many Blue Valley recreation games on its football field and gym. The building was originally home to Blue Valley Middle School before it moved to its current location in 1999.

See also
 List of high schools in Kansas
 List of unified school districts in Kansas
Other high schools in Blue Valley USD 229 school district
 Blue Valley High School in Stilwell
 Blue Valley North High School in Overland Park
 Blue Valley Northwest High School in Overland Park
 Blue Valley West High School in Overland Park
 Blue Valley Southwest High School in Overland Park

References

External links
 School Website
 Blue Valley USD 229 school district

Special schools in the United States
Public high schools in Kansas
Schools in Johnson County, Kansas